Syd Jackson may refer to:

Syd Jackson (speedway rider) (c. 1908–?), British speedway rider
Syd Jackson (footballer, born 1944), Aboriginal Australian rules footballer for East Perth and Carlton
Syd Jackson (footballer, born 1917) (1917–2000), Australian rules footballer for North Melbourne
Syd Jackson (Māori activist) (1939–2007), Māori activist, unionist, and leader
Syd Jackson (politician) (1889–1941), Australian politician